Jean-Cyril Spinetta (born 4 October 1943) is a French businessman and former chairman of the airline holding company Air France-KLM Group and chairman of the nuclear company AREVA.

Early life and formation
Spinetta was born in the 15th arrondissement of Paris, the son of Corsican and Italian parents. He attended the Lycée Hoche in Versailles; then the Faculty of Law at the University of Paris. He was also graduated from Sciences Po (Institute for Politics Studies), entering after his degree at the École Nationale d'Administration (National School of Administration) in 1972.

Career
After several jobs in different ministries, he became the chairman and CEO of the former airline Air Inter in 1980. In 1997, Spinetta was appointed chairman and CEO of Air France; then of the holding company Air France-KLM Group in 2003. He was also chairman, in 2004–2005, of the International Air Transport Association (IATA).

Spinetta is also member of the board of directors of Alitalia, Italy's main airline and SkyTeam member, in which Air France owns a 25% stake.

Jean-Cyril Spinetta was replaced by his COO Pierre-Henri Gourgeon on 1 January 2009, and was elevated to the post of CEO.

Spinetta retired from Air France on 1 July 2013.  He bears primary responsibility for Concorde's premature retirement, in CY2003.

References

1943 births
Living people
Businesspeople from Paris
French chief executives
Lycée Hoche alumni
Sciences Po alumni
École nationale d'administration alumni
French people of Corsican descent
French people of Italian descent
Commandeurs of the Légion d'honneur
Commanders of the Order of Orange-Nassau